The second HMS Whitaker (K580), and the first to enter service, was a British Captain-class frigate of the Royal Navy in commission during World War II. Originally constructed as a United States Navy Buckley class destroyer escort, she served in the Royal Navy from 1944 to 1945.

Construction and transfer
The ship was laid down as the unnamed U.S. Navy destroyer escort DE-571 by Bethlehem-Hingham Shipyard, Inc., in Hingham, Massachusetts, on 20 October 1943 and launched on 12 December 1943. She was transferred to the United Kingdom upon completion on 28 January 1944.

Service history

The ship was commissioned into service in the Royal Navy  as the frigate HMS Whitaker (K580) on 28 January 1944 simultaneously with her transfer. She served on patrol and escort duty and operated in support of the invasion of Normandy in the summer of 1944.

The German submarine U-483 torpedoed Whitaker at 0210 hours on 1 November 1944, off Malin Head on the north coast of Ireland at position . Damage control measures brought the resultant fires under control by 0320 hours but not before the ship had lost much of her bow and suffered 79 dead. Towed first to Londonderry Port, Northern Ireland, and then to Belfast, Northern Ireland, Whitaker was declared a constructive total loss, remained inactive for the rest of World War II, and was decommissioned in March 1945. The U.S. Navy struck her from its Naval Vessel Register on 19 May 1945.

The Royal Navy returned Whitaker to the U.S. Navy on 3 December 1945.

Disposal
After her return to the U.S. Navy, Whitaker remained in the United Kingdom for ultimate disposition. She was sold to John Lee of Belfast on 9 January 1947 for scrapping.

References

Navsource Online: Destroyer Escort Photo Archive Whitaker (DE-571) HMS Whitaker (K-580)
uboat.net HMS Whitaker (K 580)
Destroyer Escort Sailors Association DEs for UK
Captain Class Frigate Association HMS Whitaker K580 (DE 571)

External links
Photo gallery of HMS Whitaker (K580)

 

Captain-class frigates
Buckley-class destroyer escorts
World War II frigates of the United Kingdom
Ships built in Hingham, Massachusetts
1943 ships
Maritime incidents in November 1944